Debbie Berman is a South African film and television editor. She is best known for her editing work on multiple movies in the Marvel Cinematic Universe, including Spider-Man: Homecoming, Black Panther, and Captain Marvel.

Life and career 
She was born in Johannesburg, South Africa. She attended High School Victory Park, part of the King David Schools, and was introduced to video editing. She would edit films for school events and personal projects. She began editing television shows and movies in South Africa, before moving to Vancouver, Canada. After editing Space Chimps and Invictus, Berman moved to Los Angeles, where she was placed on the editing team for Spider-Man: Homecoming, Black Panther, and Captain Marvel.

In Spider-Man: Homecoming, Berman suggested re-shoots for scenes of Liz and Peter interacting to make Liz's character feel more genuine. While working on Black Panther, Berman convinced director Ryan Coogler to do reshoots on the final battle scene, to include the female Jabari warriors. She said that the film's style is based on James Bond and The Godfather and she began work on the production a few months later than the rest of the crew.
In 2018, she was inducted into the American Cinema Editors Guild. Her most recent work includes being an editor for Love and Monsters, a monster adventure film released in October 2020.

In August 2020, it was announced that she will be making her directorial debut by directing an adaptation of Don Handfield and Joshua Malkin's graphic novel Unikorn, which will be published in 2021.

Filmography

Film

As editor 

Berman was also credited as part of the editorial departments of Ripper 2: Letter from Within (2004), Reflection (2004), Good Session (2015), and The Jesuit (unreleased). She was the visual effects editor for In the Name of the King: A Dungeon Siege Tale (2007) and Invictus (2009).

Television

As editor

Awards and nominations 
 2012 recipient of the Sally Menke Editing Fellowship from the Sundance Institute. 
2018 - Black Panther (nominated with Michael P. Shawver) - Saturn Award - "Best Editing"
 2019 - Black Panther (nominated with Michael P. Shawver) - Alliance of Women Film Journalists - "Best Film Editing"
 2019 - Black Panther (nominated with Michael P. Shawver) - Columbus Film Critics Association - "Best Film Editing"

References

External links 
 

Living people
South African film editors
1978 births